Cachopo is a freguesia (parish) in the municipality of Tavira (Algarve, Portugal). The population in 2011 was 716, in an area of 203.53 km².

References

Freguesias of Tavira